Florentino Goikoetxea (Goicoechea, Goikoetxe) (1898-1980) was a Basque who worked for the Comet Escape Line during World II. A smuggler by profession, he guided more than 200 Allied airmen shot down in occupied Belgium and France over the Pyrenees mountains to neutral Spain from where they could be repatriated to the United Kingdom.  He was honored with the George Medal from the United Kingdom and the Legion of Honor from France.

Early life
Of humble birth and nearly illiterate, Florentino (as he was universally known) was a hunter as a youth and became familiar with the Pyrenees on the Franco-Spanish border near his home in Hernani in the Basque country of Spain. As an adult he became a smuggler.  During the Spanish Civil War (1936–1939), he escaped arrest by the Nationalists of Francisco Franco and fled from Spain to Ciboure, just across the border in France where he resided for the rest of his life.

The Comet Line
In 1941, Belgians Andrée de Jongh and Arnold Deppé created what became known as the Comet Line to help an increasing number of Allied airmen shot down over Belgium, occupied by Nazi Germany, evade capture by the Germans and return to the United Kingdom. In 1941, they pioneered a route by train from Belgium to Saint-Jean-de-Luz in the Basque country of southwestern France and hence by foot over the Pyrenees mountains into neutral Spain. Once in Spain, they turned the exfiltrated airmen over to British diplomats who arranged their return by air to Great Britain. To cross the mountains they hired Basque guides, often smugglers, who could avoid the German soldiers and border guards in France and the border guards in Spain. In April 1942, Florentino Goikoetxea became the principal guide of the Comet Line, and was credited in his Legion of Honor citation with having led 227 airmen and a number of French and Belgian agents across the border to safety in Spain.

Florentino's associates in the Basque country included Elvire de Greef, a Belgian and head of the Comet Line in southwestern France, and Kattaline Aguirre, a Basque women who sheltered escaping airmen in her house. Until her arrest in January 1943, Andrée de Jongh usually accompanied the airmen and Florentino across the border.

Shot and rescued
On July 26, 1944, Florentino was shot four times by German border guards although he managed to hide the documents he was carrying before being captured. His leg was shattered. The Germans took him to a hospital in Bayonne. The local Comet Line helpers decided to rescue him.  On July 27, Elvire de Greef visited him in the hospital and told him a rescue would be attempted.  Later that day two German-speaking Bayonne policemen showed up at the hospital in an ambulance driven by Fernand, Elvire's husband. They pretended to be Gestapo agents, demanded to take Florentino with them, put him in the ambulance, and drove away.  He remained in hiding until the Nazis abandoned southwestern France a month later.

Awards
Florentino, still a wanted man in Spain, kept a low profile after World War II.  After Spain's long-time dictator Francisco Franco died in 1975, he was honored with both the George Medal of the United Kingdom and the Legion of Honor from France.  When asked what his occupation was in the ceremony at Buckingham Palace, the old smuggler said in broken English that he was in the "import-export business."

See also
Mugalari

References

1898 births
1980 deaths
People from Hernani
French Resistance
Spain in World War II
Recipients of the George Medal
Chevaliers of the Légion d'honneur
Exiles of the Spanish Civil War in France
World War II resistance members
Mountain guides